Lee Jea-moon (born 2 July 1993) is a South Korean tennis player.

Lee has a career high ATP singles ranking of 570 achieved on 15 May 2019. He also has a career high ATP doubles ranking of 431 achieved on 13 November 2017.

Lee represents South Korea at the Davis Cup.

References

External links

1993 births
Living people
South Korean male tennis players
Tennis players at the 2018 Asian Games
Asian Games competitors for South Korea
Universiade medalists in tennis
Universiade gold medalists for South Korea
Medalists at the 2013 Summer Universiade
Medalists at the 2015 Summer Universiade
21st-century South Korean people